Thorsten Valentine Kalijarvi (died in 1980) served as Assistant Secretary of State for Economic and Business Affairs in the United States under President Dwight D. Eisenhower in 1957. He succeeded Samuel Clark Waugh and was succeeded by Thomas Clifton Mann. He served as Ambassador to El Salvador from 1957 to 1961.

References

1980 deaths
American diplomats